Le Pélégrin is an album by the group Tri Yann released in January 2001, their first album since Portraits, in 1995.

The album is a trip across Celtic regions, from Scotland to La Compostella. The songs are almost all compositions by the group. For the first time, the group uses a female singer in Bleunwenn (sister of Konan Mevel) who took over while Jean-Paul Corbineau was sick in 2000. 2001 was also the thirtieth anniversary of the group.

Tracks

Musicians 
 Jean Chocun
 Jean-Paul Corbineau
 Jean-Louis Jossic
 Gérard Goron
 Jean-Luc Chevalier 
 Konan Mevel (bagpipes)
 Freddy Bourgeois (keyboards)
 Christophe Peloil (violin)

External links 
 Official site

2001 albums
Tri Yann albums